Bernhard Termath (26 August 1928 – 24 March 2004) was a German football coach and former player.

From 1949 - 1955 he played for Rot-Weiss Essen, and then for Karlsruher SC. He earned 7 caps and scored 4 goals for West Germany from 1951 to 1954.

He was most notable for coaching the Karlsruher SC football team from 19 February 1968 to 30 June 1968.

External links

1928 births
2004 deaths
German footballers
Germany international footballers
Rot-Weiss Essen players
Karlsruher SC players
Karlsruher SC managers
Bundesliga managers
Association football forwards
German football managers
Karlsruher FV managers
Footballers from Essen
West German footballers